The Lady Hilary Groves Prize is awarded annually, to an individual who has made an "outstanding contribution to music in the community", by the United Kingdom-based Making Music. The recipient must be a member of a Making Music member group.

The award was established in 2000 as the Sir Charles Groves Internal Prize after Charles Groves  and was renamed in 2003 after the death of his wife, Lady Hilary Groves, the vice-president of Making Music.

Winners receive a certificate signed by Katharine, Duchess of Kent, who is Making Music's patron.

Winners 

Recipients include:
 
 
 
 
 
 
 
 
 
 
 
 
 
 
 
 
2018:  Mark Lawrence of Big Friendly Choir
2019: Andy Jackson of The Cobweb Orchestra
2020: Vilma Weaver of Ashira Singers

References

External links 

 

British music awards
2000 establishments in the United Kingdom